Jamie MacKenzie (born 8 May 1986) is a Scottish footballer who plays for Linlithgow Rose in the Scottish Junior Football Association, East Region. He attends Edinburgh Napier University where he is part of the "Dream Team" group in the Economics of Emerging Markets module.

Career

MacKenzie started his career with Scottish Premier League side Hibernian, but was released in 2005. He then played in the Scottish Football League for Montrose for a season before signing for Sligo Rovers in 2006. He was briefly appointed club captain following the departure of the previous captain Michael McNamara, who left Sligo to join the Sligo Gaelic Football team.

MacKenzie scored Sligo's opening goal of the 2008 season, but after 13 league appearances he moved to Aris Limassol during the mid-season summer transfer window.

On 17 February 2010 it was announced that he had completed a switch to Galway United. making his return to the League of Ireland.

After a second spell playing in Cyprus, McKenzie returned to Scotland and signed for Junior side Linlithgow Rose in November 2011.

McKenzie was called up to the Scotland Junior international squad in October 2012 for their fixture against the Republic of Ireland.

References

1986 births
Living people
Footballers from Kirkcaldy
Association football defenders
Scottish footballers
Hibernian F.C. players
Montrose F.C. players
Sligo Rovers F.C. players
Aris Limassol FC players
Galway United F.C. (1937–2011) players
Chalkanoras Idaliou players
Scottish Football League players
Scottish Junior Football Association players
League of Ireland players
Cypriot First Division players
Cypriot Second Division players
Scottish expatriate footballers
Expatriate footballers in Cyprus
Linlithgow Rose F.C. players
Scotland junior international footballers